The Voice of Romance: The Columbia Original Album Collection is a 68-disc box set by American pop singer Johnny Mathis that was released on December 8, 2017, by Legacy Recordings, a division of Sony Music Entertainment. The packaging noted that it includes 67 albums that have been remastered, several of which were being made available on CD for the first time. Two of those, I Love My Lady and The Island, were debuting in their entirety for the first time anywhere, and 38 of the bonus tracks included had also previously gone unreleased.

Critical reception
In his review of the box set for The Second Disc, Joe Marchese asserted, "What it reveals is that the history of Johnny Mathis is, put simply, the history of American music in the second half of the twentieth century." In summation he wrote, "Since Johnny Mathis's recording debut, virtually everything has changed about the sound of music, not to mention the music industry.  But Mathis has held steadfast to his core values as an artist, and as a 'singer's singer,' as he’s happily traversed from genre to genre.  That consistence of quality and variation of style makes the immersive journey contained in The Voice of Romance: The Columbia Original Album Collection one well worth taking for any fan or collector of American popular song.  Basking in the glow of this nostalgic trip, you just might get misty yourself."

Contents
Recording dates and release information taken from the liner notes.

Odds and Ends: That’s What Makes the Music Play

Track listing
Recording dates and release information taken from the liner notes.

"Teacher, Teacher" (Alternate Version) performed with Ray Conniff & His Orchestra (Robert Allen, Al Stillman) – 2:37
recorded 6/16/57 
"Wild Is the Wind" (Alternate Version) from Wild Is the Wind (1957); performed with Ray Ellis & His Orchestra (Dimitri Tiomkin, Ned Washington) – 2:33
rec. 10/31/57 
 "Now That You've Gone (Puisque tu pars)" (Petula Clark, Norman Newell, Hubert Ballay) – 3:01
rec. 11/2/67; previously unreleased 
 "What to Do About Love" (Leon Carr, Paul Vance) – 2:28
rec. 5/31/60
 "Each Time We Kiss" (Clyde Otis, Colin Towns) – 2:39
rec. 3/4/61 
 "My Favorite Dream" (Lee Pockriss, Vance) – 2:55
rec. 10/9/61
 "A Clock Without Hands" (Jerry Livingston, Paul Francis Webster) – 2:58
 "The Joy of Loving You" (Bart Howard) – 3:05
above two rec. 3/29/62; above five from the album I'll Search My Heart and Other Great Hits 
 "You Are There" (Johnny Mandel, Dave Frishberg) – 3:06
 "Fifty Fifty" (Jerry Fuller) – 3:19
above two rec. 9/22/76; both previously unreleased 
 "That's What Makes the Music Play" (Will Jennings, Roger Nichols) – 3:11
 "Let Me Be the One" (Nichols, Paul Williams) – 3:31
above two rec. 9/27/76; both previously unreleased 
 "El Amar y el Querer" (Manuel Alejandro, Ana Magdalena) – 4:13
 "Cosas Pequeñas" (Alejandro, Magdalena) – 3:11
 "Cuando Vuelvas a Casa" (Alejandro, Magdalena) – 4:00
above three rec. 2/11/83; all three from his CBS Discos album Cuando Vuelvas a Casa 
 Medley performed with Barbra Streisand  – 4:43  a. "I Have a Love" from West Side Story (Leonard Bernstein, Stephen Sondheim) b. "One Hand, One Heart" from West Side Story (Bernstein, Sondheim)
rec. 11/30/92; from the Barbra Streisand album Back to Broadway 
 "The Shadow of Your Smile"  performed with Dave Koz and Chris Botti  (Johnny Mandel, Paul Francis Webster) – 5:22
rec. 5/6/06; from the 2006 Mathis compilation Gold: A 50th Anniversary Celebration

Personnel
Credits taken from the liner notes.

Mitch Miller – producer (tracks 1, 2, 4)
Robert Mersey – producer (track 3)
Frank DeVol – producer (track 5)
Irving Townsend – producer (tracks 6–8)
Jerry Fuller – producer (tracks 9, 10)
Roger Nichols – producer (tracks 11, 12)
Jack Gold – producer (tracks 13–15)
Barbra Streisand – producer (track 16)
Phil Ramone – producer (track 17)

Box set personnel
Credits taken from the liner notes.

Johnny Mathis – executive producer; vocals
Adam Block – executive producer
John Jackson – executive producer 
Didier C. Deutsch – compilation producer
Mike Piacentini – compilation producer; mastering engineer 
Timothy J. Smith – A&R coordination
Mark Neuman – product direction
Jeremy Holiday – product direction
William McKinney – project direction
Tom Cording – press coordination
Gabby Gibb – press coordination
Matt Kelly – tape research
Michael Kull – tape research
Tina Ibañez – art direction & design
James Ritz – liner notes

Images courtesy of Rojon Productions & Sony Music Photo Archives:
CRPS
Bob Cato
Jeff Dunas
Becky Fluke
Don Hunstein
Urve Kuusik
Art Maillett
Aaron Mollin
Fred Mollin
Ricky Robinson
Rick Shaw
Sandy Speiser
David Vance

Chart positions courtesy of Joel Whitburn & Billboard Publications

References

2017 compilation albums
Johnny Mathis compilation albums
Legacy Recordings compilation albums